Nneka Onyeali-Ikpe (born July 28, 1964) is a Nigerian business executive and banker. She is the first female managing director and chief executive officer of Fidelity Bank Nigeria.

Early life 
Nneka Onyeali-Ikpe was born in Awka, Anambra State, in Eastern Nigeria. She also lived in Owerri, Imo State, where she studied at the Federal Government Girls’ College.

Education 
Onyeali-Ikpe has a law degree from the University of Nigeria, Nsukka. She also has a master's degree in Law from King's College London.

Career 
In 1990, she began working in banking as a legal officer for the now-defunct African Continental Bank. She subsequently worked as a treasury officer for the First African Trust Bank. She later joined Zenith Bank and Standard Chartered Bank respectively.

Enterprise Bank 
In 2011, she joined Enterprise Bank as an executive director of the bank's operations in Lagos and other locations in the South-Western region in Nigeria.

Fidelity Bank 
Onyeali-Ikpe joined the commercial bank Fidelity as an executive director in January, 2015. Fidelity Bank announced Onyeali-Ikpe as its managing director in December 2020.

Personal life 
Onyeali-Ikpe is married.

References 

1968 births
Living people
Alumni of King's College London
Nigerian businesspeople